S. arenarius  may refer to:
 Spalax arenarius, the sandy mole-rat, a rodent species endemic to Ukraine
 Spalerosophis arenarius, the red spotted royal snake or red-spotted diadem snake, a snake species found in India and Pakistan

See also
 Arenarius (disambiguation)